Unchi Bassi is a big village in Hoshiarpur district in the state of Punjab, India. It is just 6 km away from Dasuya city. It is a large base for Military.

Geography 

Unchi Bassi is located at 31.25°N 75.65°E.[1] It has an average elevation of 240 meters (787 feet) from sea level.
Location.

Unchi Bassi 
Unchi Bassi is located on the National Highway 44 (New) NH-1A (old) which connects Jammu and Kashmir to rest of India. It is located in the district Hoshiarpur of Punjab state in India. The city is well connected with rail and road with rest of India. Major cities in the vicinity of Unchi Bassi are Hoshiarpur (48 km), Jalandhar (65 km), Gurdaspur (36 km), Amritsar (93 km) and Pathankot (52).

Military Area & other features 
It is large ground of Military zone. One Army school, CSD canteen & ECHS clinic is also there. Dasuya - Mukeria Channel also flows through it. One hydro power station is also there. Unchi Bassi comes under post office of village Lamin.

References
 Google map.
 Hoshiarpur administration.

Cities and towns in Hoshiarpur district